Léon Aernaudts (10 August 1918 – 20 November 1992) was a Belgian footballer. He played in 20 matches for the Belgium national football team from 1947 to 1950.

References

External links
 

1918 births
1992 deaths
Belgian footballers
Belgium international footballers
Association football defenders
K. Berchem Sport players